The 2023 Oregon State Beavers football team will represent Oregon State University in the Pac–12 Conference during the 2023 NCAA Division I FBS football season. The Beavers are expected to be led by Jonathan Smith in his sixth year as Oregon State's head coach. They play their home games at Reser Stadium in Corvallis, Oregon.

Previous season

Transfers

Outgoing

Incoming

Schedule

References

Oregon State
Oregon State Beavers football seasons
Oregon State Beavers football